Theodore Trent (December 17, 1903 – January 10, 1944) was an American baseball pitcher in the Negro leagues. He played from 1927 to 1939 with several teams, playing mostly for the St. Louis Stars and Chicago American Giants. Trent was considered the best pitcher on the St. Louis Stars, when the team won three pennants from 1927 to 1931. He was nicknamed Highpockets, Stringbean, and Big Florida, because he was one of the tallest players in the Negro leagues.

References

External links
 and Baseball-Reference Black Baseball stats and Seamheads
Negro League Baseball Players Association

1903 births
1944 deaths
Chicago American Giants players
Cuban Stars (West) players
Detroit Wolves players
Homestead Grays players
New York Black Yankees players
St. Louis Stars (baseball) players
Washington Pilots players
Baseball players from Florida
20th-century African-American sportspeople
Baseball pitchers